The following is a list of players and who appeared in at least one game for the fourth of five Washington Nationals franchises of Major League Baseball, which played in the National League from  until . Players in bold are in the Baseball Hall of Fame.



A
Tug Arundel

B
Phil Baker
Jim Banning
Bob Barr
Ed Beecher

C
Bart Cantz
Jack Carney
Cliff Carroll
Spider Clark
Harry Clarke
Larry Corcoran
Ed Crane
Sam Crane

D
Ed Daily
Hugh Daily
Tom Daly
Pat Dealy
Pat Deasley
Harry Decker
Jim Donnelly

E
Hi Ebright

F
Jack Farrell
Alex Ferson
Davy Force
John Fox
Ed Fuller
Shorty Fuller

G
Gid Gardner
Barney Gilligan
Frank Gilmore
Buck Gladmon
Walt Goldsby
John Greenig

H
George Haddock
Jackie Hayes
Egyptian Healy
John Henry
Paul Hines
Sadie Houck
Dummy Hoy

I
Arthur Irwin
John Irwin

J
George Joyce

K
George Keefe
Tom Kinslow
Jimmy Knowles
Bill Krieg
Gus Krock

M
Connie Mack
Tony Madigan
Art McCoy
John McGlone
John Morrill
Miah Murray
Al Myers

O
Billy O'Brien
Pete O'Brien
Hank O'Day
Dave Oldfield

R
John Riddle

S
Dupee Shaw
George Shoch
Joe Start
Mike Sullivan
Pete Sweeney

T
John Thornton

W
Perry Werden
Jim Whitney
Wild Bill Widner
Walt Wilmot
George Winkelman
Bill Wise
Sam Wise
Bill Wright

Y
Joe Yingling

Z
Henry Zeiher

External links
Baseball Reference

Major League Baseball all-time rosters